The Best of Baccara is a compilation album by Spanish duo Baccara released by Sony-BMG UK's midprice sublabel Camden in 2005. This release includes sixteen of Baccara's hits and best-known songs from the era of the original formation (1977–1981), mainly focussing on their best-selling debut album Baccara, and finishing with two recent re-recordings dating from 1999 album Baccara 2000, by Mayte Mateos' formation of the duo.

In 2006, this compilation was to get an international re-release under the title The Very Best of Baccara with an alternate track listing.

Track listing

 "Yes Sir, I Can Boogie"  (Dostal - Soja)  - 4:35
 "Sorry, I'm a Lady"  (Dostal - Soja)  - 3:39
 "Parlez-Vous Français?" (English version) (Dostal - Soja - Zentner)  - 4:30
 "Can't Help Falling In Love" (Creatore - Peretti - Weiss) - 3:26
 "Koochie-Koo" (Dostal - Soja) - 4:04
 "Cara Mia" (Soja) - 2:53
 "Yummy, Yummy, Yummy"  (Levine - Resnick)  - 3:35
 "Gimme More"  (Soja - Zentner) - 3:50
 "Granada"  (Lara) - 4:17
 "Number One" (Dostal - Soja) - 2:37
 "Darling" (full length version)  (Dostal - Soja)  - 5:40
 "Ay, Ay Sailor"  (Dostal - Soja)  - 3:50
 "The Devil Sent You To Lorado"  (Dostal - Soja)  - 4:03
 "Feel Me" (Soja - Zentner) - 4:20
 "Adelita" (Traditional) - 2:27
 "Somewhere In Paradise"  (Sacher)  - 4:23
 "Hit Mix" ("Yes Sir I Can Boogie"/"Sorry I'm A Lady"/"Darling"/"The Devil Sent You To Lorado") (Soja - Dostal) - 5:38
 "Yes Sir I Can Boogie" (1999 karaoke version) (Soja - Dostal) - 3:30

Personnel
 Mayte Mateos - vocals
 María Mendiola - vocals, except tracks 17 & 18
 Cristina Sevilla - vocals tracks 17 & 18

Production
 Produced and arranged by Rolf Soja.
 Tracks 17 & 18 produced by Thorsten Brötzmann.

Track annotations
 Tracks 1, 2, 4, 5, 6, 8, 9, 10 & 14 from 1977 studio album Baccara.
 Track 3 from 1978: 7" single "Parlez-Vous Français? (English version)". Original French version appears on album Light My Fire.
 Tracks 7, 11 & 15  from 1978 studio album Light My Fire.
 Track 12 from 1979 studio album Colours.
 Track 13 & 16 from 1978 compilation The Hits Of Baccara.
 Track 17 taken from 1999 album Baccara 2000 by Baccara 2000 (Mayte Mateos' formation).
 Track 18 taken from 1999 CD-single "Yes Sir I Can Boogie '99" by Baccara 2000 (Mayte Mateos' formation).

Baccara albums
2005 greatest hits albums